St. Patrick's Church is a historic Roman Catholic church at 284 Suffolk Street in Lowell, Massachusetts.  Built in 1853 for a predominantly Irish congregation founded in 1831, it is one of the oldest Catholic parishes north of Boston in the United States.  The building, a fine example of Gothic Revival architecture designed by the noted ecclesiastical architect Patrick C. Keely, was listed on the National Register of Historic Places in 1985.

History
The original Saint Patrick's church was a wooden structure, built in 1831 to support the Irish workmen who had moved to Lowell, largely to work on the Pawtucket and Merrimack Canals. Prior to its construction, they were attended by Rev. John Mahoney, a Catholic clergyman from a nearby town. By 1830 there were over 400 Roman Catholics in Lowell, and on July 3, 1831, St Patrick's Church was consecrated, led by Mahoney. Mahoney left in 1836 to work in Boston, and was succeeded by E.J. McCool.

The current stone structure dates to 1853, although a fire in 1904 caused much of the church to be rebuilt by 1906.

Today
Today, the church is listed on the National Register of Historic Places. In addition to the traditional Irish and French Canadian congregations, the parish, including its school, serves local Southeast Asians, specifically with Vietnamese and Cambodian native-language Masses.

Architecture
St. Patrick's is located on the eastern edge of the Lowell neighborhood known as The Acre, an area where Irish immigrants originally settled in squatters' camps to work in Lowell's mills. The church overlooks one the city's power canals, at the junction of Suffolk and Cross Streets.  It is built in a cruciform plan out of coursed rubblestone with ashlar granite trim. A tower  in height projects from the front facade, with stone buttresses flanking the main church entrance at its base. The entrance, as well as flanking entrances on either side, are set in Gothic lancet-arched openings.  Above the main entrance is a three-part lancet-arched window, with the tall first stage of the tower completed by a smaller lancet window.  The second tower stage houses a belfry with louvered lancet-arch openings, and it is topped by an octagonal steeple ornamented with lancet dormers.

Gallery

See also
National Register of Historic Places listings in Lowell, Massachusetts

References

Bibliography

External links

 Saint Patrick's Church
 Lowell Historical Society

National Register of Historic Places in Lowell, Massachusetts
Churches on the National Register of Historic Places in Massachusetts
P
Patrick Keely buildings
Stone churches in Massachusetts
Tourist attractions in Lowell, Massachusetts